The history of Oregon State University in Corvallis, Oregon, United States, began in the era of the Oregon Territory. At first a private school, the college later became a state supported agricultural institution.

Corvallis College

In 1856, a school building was constructed in the Willamette Valley at Corvallis. The structure would serve as home to a private academy until 1858. Named Corvallis Academy, this was the area's first community school for primary and preparatory education. The local chapter of the Freemasons played an important role in developing the concept to eventually establish a state college in the city and initiated the construction of the early campus with the original donation of land.

In 1858, what would become Oregon State University began as Corvallis College as it was formally incorporated by members of the Freemasons. At that time the school did not offer college level courses. Years later the school's ownership was transferred to the Methodist Episcopal Church. In 1865, William A. Finley was named as the school's first president. The school as began offering a bachelor's degree that year.

State school
Corvallis College was incorporated by the church in 1868, and the state of Oregon designated the school as the State Agricultural College (SAC). In 1873, the school became the first West Coast school to offer a course in agriculture. The two-year program had been approved by the Oregon Legislative Assembly. State Agricultural College became a completely state run school in 1885. In 1889, the original building of Corvallis College was torn down. In 1888 the college informally became known as Oregon Agricultural College (OAC), a name not made official until 1907.

By 1934, Mary J. L. McDonald made donations that allowed for the purchase of the land that comprises the McDonald Forest owned by the school, which also includes Peavy Arboretum.

Oregon State

The school's growing diversity in degrees led to another name change in 1937, when the college became Oregon State College.

Naval ROTC, and the program of Naval Sciences, were added to the existing Army ROTC program in 1946. The Air Force ROTC program was included in 1949, making Oregon State one of only 33 universities in the country to offer officer training for all branches of the United States Armed Forces.

Although OSU's academics mainly focused on agriculture, engineering and business through the 1960s; liberal arts remained an important part of the curriculum throughout its history. In fact, one of the more famous novelists of the 20th century taught English composition in 1940s and 50s. Bernard Malamud used his experiences as a professor at OSU for the basis of his novel A New Life. He was also awarded the 1967 Pulitzer Prize for his novel The Fixer, named after a store in downtown Corvallis. Malamud's most famous book, The Natural, was said to have been greatly influenced by OSU's first appearance in the college world series playoffs in 1952. 

Linus Pauling, Class of 1922, became Oregon State's first  Nobel Laureate alumnus in 1954 when he received the Nobel Prize in Chemistry for his work elucidating the nature of the atomic bonds. In 1962, he was awarded the Nobel Peace Prize for his campaign against nuclear weapons testing. He joined Marie Curie as the only person to win two different Nobels. Curie's physics prize was shared with her husband, Pierre Curie. Both of Pauling's prizes were unshared.  The university's current title, Oregon State University, was adopted on March 6, 1961 by a legislative act signed into law by Governor Mark Hatfield. A new library, the William Jasper Kerr Library, opened in 1963. That building was expanded twice, and after the latest expansion nearly doubled the size that ended in 1999, the library was renamed as The Valley Library.

School presidents
The position of President was created in 1865. From 1868 to 1929 the president reported to the institution's own Board of Trustees/Regents. Since the creation of the Oregon University System (OUS), the president has reported to the OUS chancellor.

List of presidents:

 William A. Finley (1865–1872)
 Joseph Emery (1872, acting)
 Benjamin L. Arnold (1872–1892)
 John D. Letcher (1892, acting)
 John M. Bloss (1892–1896)
 H. B. Miller (1896–1897)
 Thomas M. Gatch (1897–1907)
 William Jasper Kerr (1907–1932)
 George Wilcox Peavy (1932–1934, acting) (1934–1940)
 Frank Llewellyn Ballard (1940–1941)
 Francois Archibald Gilfillan (1941–1942, acting)
 August Leroy Strand (1942–1961)
 James Herbert Jensen (1961–1969)
 Roy Alton Young (1969–1970, acting)
 Robert William MacVicar (1970–1984)
 John V. Byrne (1984–1995)
 Paul G. Risser (1996–2002)
 Timothy P. White (2003, acting)
 Edward John Ray (2003–2020)
 F. King Alexander (2020-2021)
 Rebecca Johnson (2021-2022)
 Jayathi Murthy (2022-present)

See also
Oregon State Beavers

References

External links
Oregon State University Archives
Oregon History Project: Education, Arts, and Letters: Professionalizing Education
Oregon Stater: Keeping the Sheriff Away
 Oregon Stater: Echoes of 1907

Oregon State University
Oregon State